
Year 549 (DXLIX) was a common year starting on Friday (link will display the full calendar) of the Julian calendar. The denomination 549 for this year has been used since the early medieval period, when the Anno Domini calendar era became the prevalent method in Europe for naming years.

Events 
 By place 
 Byzantine Empire 
 Siege of Rome: The Ostrogoths under Totila besiege Rome for the third time, after Belisarius has returned to Constantinople. He offers a peace agreement, but this is rejected by Emperor Justinian I.
 Totila conquers the city of Perugia (Central Italy) and stations a Gothic garrison. He takes bishop Herculanus prisoner, and orders him to be completely flayed. The Ostrogoth soldier asked to perform this gruesome execution shows pity, and decapitates Herculanus before the skin on every part of his body is removed. 
 In the Circus Maximus, first and largest circus in Rome, the last chariot races are held.

 Europe 
 January - Battle of Ciiil Conaire, Ireland: Ailill Inbanda and his brother are defeated and killed.
 Agila I succeeds Theudigisel as king of the Visigoths, after he is murdered by a group of conspirators during a banquet in Seville.

 Persia 
 Spring – Lazic War: The Byzantine army under Bessas combines forces with King Gubazes II, and defeats the Persians in Lazica (modern Georgia) in a surprise attack. The survivors retreat into Caucasian Iberia.
 The Romans unsuccessfully besiege Petra, Lazica.

 Asia 
 Jianwen Di succeeds his father Wu Di as emperor of the Liang Dynasty (China).

 By topic 
 Religion 
 c. 549–564 – Transfiguration of Christ, mosaic in the apse, Church of the Virgin, Saint Catherine's Monastery in Egypt, is made.
 Fifth Council of Orléans: Nine archbishops and forty-one bishops pronounce an anathema against the errors of Nestorius and Eutyches. 
 Bishop Maximianus of Ravenna consecrates the Basilica of Sant'Apollinare in Classe.
 The Roman Catholic Diocese of Ossory (which still exists) is founded in Ireland.

Births 
Abū Lahab, uncle and staunch critic of prophet        Muhammad (d. 624)
 Jizang, Chinese Buddhist monk (d. 623)

Deaths 
 January – Ailill Inbanda, king of Connacht (Ireland) (killed in battle)
 February 16 – Zhu Yi, official of the Liang dynasty (b. 483)
 December 12 – Finnian of Clonard, Irish monastic saint (b. 470)
exact date unknown
Ciarán of Clonmacnoise, Irish monastic saint
Gao Cheng, official and regent of Eastern Wei (b. 521)
Herculanus, bishop of Perugia
Theudigisel, king of the Visigoths (assassinated)
Túathal Máelgarb, king of Tara (Ireland)
Wu Di, emperor of the Liang dynasty (b. 464)
Xiao Zhengde, prince of the Liang dynasty
Xu Zhaopei, princess of the Liang dynasty

References 

Bibliography